At Home with David Jones is an Australian television series which aired from 1963 to 1964 on Canberra station CTC-7. It was among a small number of television series produced in that state during the 1960s, and was among the earliest such series. The series was about cooking and interior decorating. "David Jones" was not a person on the series, rather it referred to the name of the sponsor.

The series was hosted by Marge Christian.

See also
Tonight in Canberra
An Evening With
Canberra Gardener
Canberra Week

References

External links
At Home with David Jones on IMDb

1963 Australian television series debuts
1964 Australian television series endings
Black-and-white Australian television shows
English-language television shows
Australian cooking television series
1960s cooking television series